Heavy Bass Blues is the sixth studio album by the Serbian alternative rock band Disciplina Kičme, and the second to be released by the London version of the band working under an alternative band name Disciplin A Kitschme. The album was released by the Tom Tom Music for former Yugoslavia and Babaroga records for the United Kingdom. Part of the material on the album featured rerecorded versions of Disciplina Kičme songs, featuring lyrics in English language.

Track listing 
All tracks written by Black Tooth, except track 5, written by John D. Loudermilk, and arranged by Disciplin A Kitschme.

Personnel

The band 
 Black Tooth (Dušan Kojić) — bass, vocals [shouting], producer, mixed by, written by
 Gofie Bebe — vocals, percussion
 Beat (Pete Warren) — drums, percussion, vocals [screaming], mixed by (tracks: 4, 8, 12)

Additional personnel 
 Skip McDonald — producer [recording], performer [vibe maker], mixed by (tracks: 3, 7, 9), backing vocals (track 2)
 DJ Illusion Excluder — mixed by (tracks: 3, 4, 7 to 9, 12)
 Pete Lorentz — engineer (tracks: 1, 2, 5, 6, 10, 11)
 Darren (Darren Grant) — recorded by (tracks: 2, 3, 6, 7, 9 to 11) 
 Dave Murder — recorded by (tracks: 4, 5, 8, 12)

References 
 EX YU ROCK enciklopedija 1960-2006, Janjatović Petar; 
 Heavy Bass Blues at Discogs

1998 albums
Disciplina Kičme albums